New Departure may refer to:

New Departure (Ireland), various attempts at cooperation between Irish Republicans and Home Rulers in the late 19th century
New Departure (Democrats), the change of policy of Southern Democrats in the US in 1870 to cease opposition to Reconstruction and black suffrage